Cecil James "Cece" Browne (February 13, 1896 – August 13, 1985) was a Canadian professional ice hockey left winger who was selected "Manitoba's Athlete of the Century" in 1970.

Born in Winnipeg, Manitoba, Browne played 13 games in the National Hockey League for the Chicago Black Hawks in the 1927–28 season, scoring two goals, before an injury sent him back home.

Browne also played baseball in Winnipeg with the Dominion Express team.

Career statistics

Regular season and playoffs

Awards and achievements 
AHA Scoring Champion (1927)
Honoured Member of the Manitoba Hockey Hall of Fame
Inducted into the Manitoba Sports Hall of Fame and Museum in 1980

References

Notes

External links
 
 

1896 births
1985 deaths
Canadian expatriate ice hockey players in the United States
Canadian ice hockey right wingers
Chicago Blackhawks players
Seattle Eskimos players
Ice hockey people from Winnipeg
Winnipeg Hockey Club players
Winnipeg Maroons players
Winnipeg Monarchs players
20th-century Canadian people